The 2010 Ms. Olympia was an IFBB professional bodybuilding competition and part of Joe Weider's Olympia Fitness & Performance Weekend 2010 was held on September 24, 2010, at the South Hall in the Las Vegas Convention Center in Winchester, Nevada and in the Orleans Arena at The Orleans Hotel and Casino in Paradise, Nevada.  It was the 31st Ms. Olympia competition held.  Other events at the exhibition included the 202 Olympia Showdown, Mr. Olympia, Fitness Olympia, Figure Olympia, and Bikini Olympia contests.

Prize money
1st $28,000
2nd $14,000
3rd $8,000
4th $5,000
5th $3,000
6th $2,000
Total: $60,000

Results
 1st - Iris Kyle
 2nd - Yaxeni Oriquen-Garcia
 3rd - Debi Laszewski
 4th - Sheila Bleck
 5th - Dayana Cadeau
 6th - Heather Foster
 7th - Cathy LeFrançois
 8th - Tina Chandler
 9th - Helen Bouchard
 10th - Brigita Brezovac
 11th - Zoa Linsey
Comparison to previous Olympia results:
Same - Iris Kyle
+3 - Yaxeni Oriquen-Garcia
Same - Debi Laszewski
+3 - Dayana Cadeau
+6 - Heather Foster
+1 - Cathy LeFrançois
+2 - Tina Chandler

Scorecard

Attended
13th Ms. Olympia attended - Yaxeni Oriquen-Garcia
12th Ms. Olympia attended - Iris Kyle 
11th Ms. Olympia attended - Dayana Cadeau
4th Ms. Olympia attended - Cathy LeFrançois
3rd Ms. Olympia attended - Heather Foster
2nd Ms. Olympia attended - Debi Laszewski and Tina Chandler
1st Ms. Olympia attended - Zoa Linsey, Brigita Brezovac, Helen Bouchard, and Sheila Bleck
Previous year Olympia attendees who did not attend - Heather Armbrust, Betty Viana-Adkins, Rosemary Jennings, Heather Foster, Nicole Ball, Gale Frankie, Kristy Hawkins, Betty Pariso, and Lisa Aukland

Notable events
This was Iris Kyle's 6th overall and 5th consecutive Olympia win, thus tied her with Cory Everson with the number of overall Olympia wins and surpassed Kim Chizevsky's number of a consecutive Olympia wins.
The song played during the posedown was Bring Em Out by T.I.

2010 Ms. Olympia qualified

2010 EUROPA BATTLE OF CHAMPIONS

Hartford, Connecticut, USA, July 24, 2010

1. Brigita Brezovac, 

2. Helen Bouchard, 

3. Cathy LeFrancois, 

2010 PRO BODYBUILDING WEEKLY CHAMPIONSHIPS

Tampa, Florida, USA, July 17, 2010

1. Brigita Brezovac, 

2. Tina Chandler, 

3. Cathy LeFrancois, 

2010 NEW YORK PRO

New York, New York, USA, May 8, 2010

1. Cathy LeFrancois, 

2. Sheila Bleck, 

3. Heather Foster, 

2010 MS. INTERNATIONAL

Columbus, Ohio, USA, March 5, 2010

1. Iris Kyle, 

2. Yaxeni Oriquen-Garcia, 

3. Debbie Laszewski, 

4. Lisa Aukland, 

5. Betty Pariso, 

6. Dayana Cadeau, 

2010 PHOENIX PRO

Phoenix, Arizona, USA, February 20, 2010

1. Yaxeni Oriquen-Garcia, 

2. Betty Pariso, 

3. Zoa Linsey, 
2009 MS. OLYMPIA

Las Vegas, Nevada, USA, September 25, 2009

1. Iris Kyle, 

2. Heather Armbrust, 

3. Debbie Laszewski, 

4. Lisa Aukland, 

5. Yaxeni Oriquen-Garcia, 

6. Betty Pariso,

See also
 2010 Mr. Olympia

References

2010 in bodybuilding
Ms. Olympia
Ms. Olympia
History of female bodybuilding
Ms. Olympia 2010